Flemsøya or Skuløya is an island in Ålesund Municipality in Møre og Romsdal county, Norway. The  island is located between the islands of Haramsøya and Fjørtofta. The island is connected to the neighboring island of Haramsøya by the Ullasund Bridge. The population (2015) of the island was 503. The eastern and southern coastline is flat, the rest of the island is mountainous. The village of Longva is located on the west side of the island, along the Longvafjorden.

The new Nordøyvegen bridge and tunnel project will connect the island of Flemsøya to the mainland and its neighboring islands when it is completed in 2022.

See also
List of islands of Norway

References

Ålesund
Islands of Møre og Romsdal